Valeria Marini (born 14 May 1967) is an Italian actress, showgirl and entrepreneur.

Biography
Born in Rome, to a Sardinian mother and a father from Rome, but raised in Cagliari, Valeria's first cinematographic appearance was in 1987 in the film Cronaca nera. After this she made her debut in theatre with the comedy I ragazzi irresistibili, in 1991. In 1992 she debuted in television with the show Luna di miele. It was in this programme that she was noticed by director Pierfrancesco Pingitore, who chose her to replace Pamela Prati in the Bagaglino spectaculars, annual series of theatre shows transformed into television variety programmes. She took part in several series of these such as Bucce di banana, Champagne, Rose rosse, Viva le italiane, Miconsenta, Barbecue.

After these performances, her fame grew in Italy; in 1997 she was nominated to present the Festival di Sanremo with Mike Bongiorno and Piero Chiambretti.

She has also acted in several films, and in the 2000s, she began a career as a fashion designer. In 2006 she took part in the reality show Reality Circus. In 2010 she co-hosted the television programme I raccomandati, with Pupo, Emanuele Filiberto and Georgia Luzi. In the same year she acted as herself in a scene of Somewhere, directed by Sofia Coppola. In 2012 she took part as a contestant in the ninth season of L'isola dei Famosi, the Italian version of Survivor. In 2014 she acted in the film A Golden Boy, directed by Pupi Avati. In 2015 she took part as a contestant, coupled with Federico Degli Esposti, in the third season of Notti sul ghiaccio, the Italian version of Skating with Celebrities. In 2016 she participated to the first season of Grande Fratello VIP, the Italian version of Celebrity Big Brother. In 2018 she participated to the VIP episode of Alta Infedeltà with Daniele Marcheggiani and Chiara Condrò.

Theater
I ragazzi irresistibili, directed by Marco Parodi (1991)
Nata Ieri, directed by Giuseppe Patroni Griffi (1996)
All'Angelo Azzurro, directed by Giorgio Albertazzi (2000)
 Magnàmose tutto! - Donne che avete intelletto d'amore, directed by Pier Francesco Pingitore (2016-2017)
 La Presidente - Valeria Marini eletta al Quirinale, directed by Pier Francesco Pingitore (2020)

Filmography

Advertisements
IP (1994–1996)
3 Italia (2005–2006)
Puntoshop Channel (2007)
Lambretta Pato (2008)
Sansui (2009–2013)
Akai (2012–2013)
Tisanoreica (2015–2016)
Acqua & Sapone (2018)

Discography
Volare (2010)
Me Gusta (2019)
Boom (2020)

Publication
Lezioni intime, Milan, Cairo Editore,

References

External links

1967 births
Living people
Italian female models
Italian showgirls
People from Cagliari
Participants in Italian reality television series
Italian film actresses
Sardinian women